Donald Dari Soditey (born September 25, 1957) is a Ghanaian politician and member of the Sixth Parliament of the Fourth Republic of Ghana representing the  Sawla/Tuna/Kalba Constituency in the Northern Region on the ticket of the National Democratic Congress.

Early life and education 
Soditey was born on September 25, 1957. He hails from Carpenteryir - Sawla, a town in the Northern Region of Ghana. He earned a teachers' certificate in 1990. He also studied for a Diploma in Education at the University of Education, Winneba.

Career 
Donald was a Principal Superintendent and a Headteacher as Belma Primary School. He has been a Member of Parliament from January 2005. He is an educationist and a teacher as well.

Politics 
Soditey is a member of the National Democratic Congress (NDC). In the 2008 Ghanaian general elections, he was elected as the Member of Parliament for the Sawla/Tuna/Kalba constituency for the 5th parliament of the 4th republic. He was elected with 12,290 out of 21,050 of total valid votes cast, equivalent to 58.38% of total valid votes cast. He was elected over Joseph Hongiri Naah Vugu of the New Patriotic Party, Yaapuo Edward Kwabena of the People's National Convention, Gilbieri Jonathan Laamiitey of the Democratic Freedom Party and Abdulai A Wahid of the Convention People's Party. These obtained 38.33%, 1.49%, 0.67% and 1.13% respectively of total valid votes cast. In 2012, he contested for the Sawla/Tuna/Kalba seat on the ticket of the NDC for the Member of parliament of the sixth parliament of the fourth republic and won.

Personal life 
Soditey is a Christian (Catholic). He is married with eight children.

References 

1957 births
Living people
National Democratic Congress (Ghana) politicians
University of Education, Winneba alumni
Ghanaian MPs 2005–2009
Ghanaian MPs 2009–2013
Ghanaian MPs 2013–2017